United States v. Pink, 315 U.S. 203 (1942), was a  United States Supreme Court  decision related to the Litvinov Assignment, wherein the US government recognised Soviet Russia as the successor of the previous Russian government. The United States sued Louis H. Pink, the Superintendent of Insurance of the State of New York, for claims regarding the First Russian Insurance Company.

The First Russian Insurance Company was organized under the former Russian government. The company opened an American branch in New York in 1907.   After the Russian Revolution, the Russian government nationalized all insurance companies, including First Russian. The case concerned the return of over $1 million in assets held by the Superintendent of Insurance pursuant to the Litvinov Assignment. New York law granted marshalling preference of the nationalized assets to foreign creditors over American creditors.

The court stated that the action of New York 

The court ruled that rights to the property in question passed from the Soviet government to the United States by the Litvinov Assignment.

See also

List of United States Supreme Court cases, volume 315

References

External links
 

United States Supreme Court cases
United States Supreme Court cases of the Stone Court
1942 in United States case law